Darab — formerly Darabkert, or Darábgerd ("city of Darius")— is a city and capital of Darab County, Fars Province, Iran.  At the 2006 census, its population was 54,513, in 13,279 families.

Historical background
Darab is one of the oldest cities in Iran, and is mentioned in the Persian epic Shahname by Ferdowsi. Legend ascribes the foundation of the city to Darius I, hence its earlier name Daráb-gerd (Darius-town).

In the neighborhood there are various remains, including the Kalah i Daráb (citadel of Darius), which consists of a series of earthworks arranged in a circle around an isolated rock. Another monument in the vicinity is a giant bas-relief, carved on the vertical face of a rock, representing the victory of the Sasanian king Shapur I over the Roman emperor Valerian in 260 A.D.

According to Hamza al-Isfahani, the city was triangular in design, and the circular defensive wall, which has been uncovered, was built in the 8th century by a governor of Fars under Hajjaj ibn Yusuf. The circle is irregular, and about 1,900 m in diameter.

During most of the Middle Ages, the city remained the capital of a large district. The city's products included textiles, jasmine oil, various mineral salts, and mumiya, a mineral exudate.

Climate

Agricultural products
Major city products are wheat, citrus, cotton, maize and palm.

Higher education 
The city has five universities: Islamic Azad University, Darab Branch; Payame Noor University, Darab center; agriculture and national resources school of Darab; Paramedical school of Darab; and a branch of the Technical and Vocational University.

In literature
In the notes to his long mystical poem The Kasidah (1880), Sir Richard Francis Burton describes his alter ego "Haji Abdu El-Yezdi" as being a native of Darab.

References

Populated places in Darab County
Cities in Fars Province
Sasanian cities
Achaemenid cities
Darius the Great